Robert Vivian Pound (May 16, 1919 – April 12, 2010) was a Canadian-American physicist who helped discover nuclear magnetic resonance (NMR) and who devised the famous Pound–Rebka experiment supporting general relativity. He became a tenured professor of physics at Harvard without ever having received a graduate degree.

Pound was born in Ridgeway, Ontario.

The discovery of NMR won the Nobel Prize in physics in 1952, though, due to the limitation on the number of recipients and the simultaneous achievements of Felix Bloch's group, only two recipients were designated. In his address to recipient Ed Purcell, Professor Hulthén nevertheless celebrated the "very interesting experiment you performed together with Dr. Pound", making Pound one of only two collaborators explicitly named in the speech. Pound received the National Medal of Science in 1990 for his lifetime contributions to the field of physics. Pound was the Mallinckrodt Professor of Physics emeritus at Harvard University.  He was a member of the class of 1941 at the University at Buffalo.

Pound's name is also attached to the Pound–Drever–Hall technique used to lock the frequency of a laser on a stable optical cavity.

References

External links
 

American physicists
American nuclear physicists
National Medal of Science laureates
Harvard University faculty
1919 births
2010 deaths
Members of the United States National Academy of Sciences
Fellows of the American Academy of Arts and Sciences
Members of the French Academy of Sciences
Canadian emigrants to the United States